Andrei Aleksandrovich Murnin (born 11 May 1985) is a Russian former professional football player.

Club career
He made his Russian Football National League debut for FC Sokol Saratov on 27 March 2005 in a game against FC SKA-Energiya Khabarovsk.

He made his Russian Premier League debut for FC Khimki on 14 August 2020 in a game against PFC Sochi, at the age of 35.

References

External links
 

1985 births
Sportspeople from Saratov
Living people
Russian footballers
Association football midfielders
FC Salyut Belgorod players
FC Sokol Saratov players
FC SKA-Khabarovsk players
FC Tosno players
FC Fakel Voronezh players
FC Tambov players
FC Khimki players
FC Khimik Dzerzhinsk players
Russian Premier League players